France Štiglic (12 November 1919 – 4 May 1993) was a Slovenian film director and screenwriter. His 1948 film On Our Own Land was entered into the 1949 Cannes Film Festival. His film The Ninth Circle (1960) was Yugoslavia's submission for the Academy Award for Best Foreign Language Film at the 33rd Academy Awards, where it was shortlisted for the award.

Selected filmography
 On Our Own Land (Na svoji zemlji, 1948)
 Valley of Peace (Dolina miru, 1956)
 The Ninth Circle (Deveti krug, 1960)
 Ballad About a Trumpet and a Cloud (Balada o trobenti in oblaku, 1961)
 Don't Cry, Peter (Ne joči, Peter, 1964)
 Amandus (1966)
 Story of Good People (Povest o dobrih ljudeh, 1975)

References

External links

1919 births
1993 deaths
Slovenian film directors
Slovenian screenwriters
Male screenwriters
Prešeren Award laureates
Golden Arena for Best Director winners
Yugoslav film directors
Film people from Kranj
20th-century screenwriters